Mirrored Hate Painting is the second studio album by the Norwegian black metal band Carpe Tenebrum. It was recorded in winter 1998 at The Abyss Studio and released in 1999 through Karmageddon Media. Stylistically the album is similar to Dimmu Borgir's Spiritual Black Dimensions (which is the only full-length Dimmu Borgir album featuring Astennu), albeit heavier and less symphonic. The album has an arguably obscure atmosphere because of the atypical cover artwork, the poetic lyrics and the bizarrely edited speech samples between some of the songs. The band again used a drum machine although Nagash is listed as the drummer.

Track listing 
All songs composed by Astennu, lyrics written by Ariadne A. Done and Astennu.

 The song "Lured Like You Thought" is listed as instrumental although it obviously has lyrics provided by Stian Arnesen.
 Track 5 is misspelled "And Forever" on the back cover.

Personnel
Astennu - guitars, bass, keyboards, drum programming
Nagash - vocals

Additional personnel
Ariadne A. Done - lyrics
Tommy Tägtgren - mixing

References

1999 albums
Carpe Tenebrum albums
Hammerheart Records albums